In mathematics, the Iverson bracket, named after Kenneth E. Iverson, is a notation that generalises the Kronecker delta, which is the Iverson bracket of the statement . It maps any statement to a function of the free variables in that statement. This function is defined to take the value 1 for the values of the variables for which the statement is true, and takes the value 0 otherwise. It is generally denoted by putting the statement inside square brackets:

In other words, the Iverson bracket of a statement is the indicator function of the set of values for which the statement is true.

The Iverson bracket allows using capital-sigma notation without restriction on the summation index. That is, for any property  of the integer , one can rewrite the restricted sum  in the unrestricted form .

The notation was originally introduced by Kenneth E. Iverson in his programming language APL, though restricted to single relational operators enclosed in parentheses, while the generalisation to arbitrary statements,  notational restriction to square brackets, and applications to summation, was advocated by Donald Knuth to avoid ambiguity in parenthesized logical expressions.

Properties
There is a direct correspondence between arithmetic on Iverson brackets, logic, and set operations. For instance, let A and B be sets and  any property of integers; then we have

Examples
The notation allows moving boundary conditions of summations (or integrals) as a separate factor into the summand, freeing up space around the summation operator, but more importantly allowing it to be manipulated algebraically.

Double-counting rule

We mechanically derive a well-known sum manipulation rule using Iverson brackets:

Summation interchange
The well-known rule  is likewise easily derived:

Counting
For instance, the Euler phi function that counts the number of positive integers up to n which are coprime to n can be expressed by

Simplification of special cases
Another use of the Iverson bracket is to simplify equations with special cases. For example, the formula

Common functions

Many common functions, especially those with a natural piecewise definition, may be expressed in terms of the Iverson bracket.  The Kronecker delta notation is a specific case of Iverson notation when the condition is equality. That is,

The Heaviside step function, sign function, and absolute value function are also easily expressed in this notation:

and

The comparison functions max and min (returning the larger or smaller of two arguments) may be written as
 and

The floor and ceiling functions can be expressed as

and

where the index  of summation is understood to range over all the integers.

The ramp function can be expressed

The trichotomy of the reals is equivalent to the following identity:

The Möbius function has the property (and can be defined by recurrence as)

Formulation in terms of usual functions
Following one common convention, those quantities are equal where defined:  is 1 if , is 0 if , and is undefined otherwise.

Notational variations
In addition to the now-standard square brackets  and the original parentheses  blackboard bold brackets have also been used, e.g.  as well as other unusual forms of bracketing marks available in the publisher's typeface, accompanied by a marginal note.

See also 
 Boolean function
 Type conversion in computer programming: many languages allow numeric or pointer quantities to be used as boolean quantities
 Indicator function

References

Mathematical notation